89th Brigade may refer to:

 89th Indian Infantry Brigade
 Oz Brigade (Israel)
 89th Mixed Brigade (Spain)
 89th Brigade (United Kingdom)
 89th Military Police Brigade (United States)
 89th Sustainment Brigade (United States)

See also

 89th Division (disambiguation)